USS Pinafore (SP-450) was a United States Navy launch in commission from 1902 to 1920.

Pinafore was built in 1902 by the Mare Island Navy Yard at Vallejo, California, as a ferry launch. The Mare Island Navy Yard used her as a construction and repair launch. Around the time the United States entered World War I in April 1917, she received the section patrol registry number SP-450.

Pinafore was stricken from the Navy List on 1 July 1920.

References
 
 NavSource Online: Section Patrol Craft Photo Archive: Pinafore (SP 450)

Auxiliary ships of the United States Navy
World War I auxiliary ships of the United States
Ships built in Vallejo, California
1902 ships